Skelton Icefalls is a prominent icefall extending in an arc some 15 nautical miles (28 km) from Portal Mountain to the north end of Warren Range, in Victoria Land. Named by Advisory Committee on Antarctic Names (US-ACAN) in 1964 in association with Skelton Neve and Skelton Glacier.

It was named by the US-ACAN in 1964 for its proximity to the Skelton Icefalls.

See also
Mount Metschel

References

Icefalls of Antarctica